Azadkhani may refer to:

Azadkhani, Khorramabad
Azadkhani, Selseleh